Ashton Cyrillien (born May 6, 1975) is an Antigua and Barbudan football player. He has played for Antigua and Barbuda national team.

National team statistics

References

1975 births
Living people
Antigua and Barbuda footballers
Place of birth missing (living people)
Antigua and Barbuda international footballers
Association football defenders